is a Japanese football player who plays for Ehime FC.

Club career
Tokushige was born in Kagoshima on March 9, 1984. After graduating from high school, he joined J1 League club Urawa Reds in 2002. However he could not play at all in the match behind Norihiro Yamagishi and Ryota Tsuzuki. In October 2004, he was loaned to Cerezo Osaka. He debuted against Shimizu S-Pulse on November 23. However he could only play this match. Although he returned to Reds in 2005, he could not play at all in the match. In August 2005, he moved to Vissel Kobe. Although he played several matches every season, he could not play many matches behind Kota Ogi and Tatsuya Enomoto. From summer 2010, he became a regular goalkeeper under new manager Masahiro Wada. and he played all 34 matches in 2011 season. However Vissel was relegated to J2 League end of 2012 season. In 2013, although he lost his position behind new player Kaito Yamamoto, he became a regular goalkeeper in June again and Vissel was promoted to J1 in a year. However he could not play many matches behind Yamamoto and Kim Seung-gyu from 2014. In 2018, he moved to newly was promoted to J1 League club, V-Varen Nagasaki. Although he played as regular goalkeeper, V-Varen was relegated to J2 end of 2018 season.

National team career
In September 2001, Tokushige was selected Japan U-17 national team for 2001 U-17 World Championship. He played full time in all 3 matches.

Career statistics

References

External links

Profile at V-Varen Nagasaki

1984 births
Living people
Association football people from Kagoshima Prefecture
Japanese footballers
Japan youth international footballers
J1 League players
J2 League players
J3 League players
Urawa Red Diamonds players
Cerezo Osaka players
Vissel Kobe players
V-Varen Nagasaki players
Ehime FC players
Association football goalkeepers
People from Kagoshima